This is the 2007 Westmeath Gaelic football Championship 2007. The winners will go onto contest the Leinster Club SFC.

The winners in 2006 were Tyrrellspass.

Group stage

Group Games
Group 1:

Group 2:

Knock-Out Stages

Relegation
Bottom team in each group will play a playoff with loser dropping to play in the 2008 Westmeath Intermediate Football Championship

Westmeath Senior Football Championship
2007